The IX Gran Premio de Penya Rhin was a motor race for Formula One cars held at Pedralbes Circuit, Barcelona on 31 October 1948. Luigi Villoresi won the race in a Maserati 4CLT/48. Villoresi also qualified on pole position and set fastest lap. Reg Parnell was second in another 4CLT/48 and Louis Chiron third in a Talbot-Lago T26C.

Result

References

Penya Rhin
Penya Rhin